Dudley Doolittle (June 21, 1881 – November 14, 1957) was a U.S. Representative from Kansas.

Born in Cottonwood Falls, Kansas, Doolittle attended the public schools and the University of Kansas at Lawrence, being graduated from its law department in 1903. He was admitted to the bar the same year and commenced practice at Cottonwood Falls, Kansas, in 1904. He served as prosecuting attorney of Chase County 1908-1912. He served as mayor of Strong City in 1912.

Doolittle was elected as a Democrat to the Sixty-third, Sixty-fourth, and Sixty-fifth Congresses (March 4, 1913 – March 3, 1919). He was an unsuccessful candidate for reelection in 1918 to the Sixty-sixth Congress. Representative of the United States Treasury Department to Italy in 1919. Federal Prohibition Director for Kansas in 1920. He engaged in the practice of law in Strong City, Kansas, Kansas City, Missouri, and Washington, D.C. from 1921 to 1934.

Doolittle was elected a member of the Democratic National Committee in 1925. He served as general agent of the ninth district, Farm Credit Administration from 1934 to 1938. He served as member of the board of directors of the College of Emporia and served as its president 1938-1940. He served as president of the Strong City State Bank and a director of the Exchange National Bank of Cottonwood Falls at time of death. He died in Emporia, Kansas on November 14, 1957. He was interred in Prairie Grove Cemetery, Cottonwood Falls, Kansas.

References

1881 births
1957 deaths
Democratic Party members of the United States House of Representatives from Kansas
20th-century American politicians
People from Cottonwood Falls, Kansas